, known as Everybody's Golf in the PAL region and Hot Shots Golf: Open Tee in North America, is the fifth game in the Everybody's Golf series and the first game released for PlayStation Portable. It was released on 12 December 2004 in Japan, 3 May 2005 in North America and 1 September 2005 in Europe and Australia. The game was a launch title for the PlayStation Portable both in Japan and PAL regions.

Gameplay
Everybody's Golf Portable is a golf game that emphasizes arcade-like gameplay over real life accuracy or locations. The game features all fictional characters and courses. It features several different modes, including a training mode to learn the game, simple match play, and a challenge mode feature many golf tournaments and unlockable items used to customizes the player's golfer.

Reception

The game received "favourable" reviews according to the review aggregation website Metacritic. Praise was given to its art style and simple but effect game mechanics. IGN said: "Open Tee is easy to fall in love with. Sometimes you'll shout for joy, other times you'll curse in frustration. But it's all Hot Shots golfing, and this is one of the most spectacular golfing games out there". In Japan, Famitsu gave it a score of one eight, one nine, and two eights for a total of 33 out of 40.

References

External links
 

2004 video games
Golf video games
PlayStation Portable games
PlayStation Portable-only games
Sony Interactive Entertainment games
Everybody's Golf
Video games developed in Japan